Love Death Immortality is the second album from American electronic music trio The Glitch Mob. It was released on Glass Air Records on February 11, 2014. The album debuted at number 13 on the Billboard 200; as of June 2014, the album has sold 40,000 copies in the United States.

The Glitch Mob explored a different style of music and a "stadium sound" on the sophomore album. "We always like to challenge ourselves, try different things, try different tempos and sounds of mixing music, working with vocalists, and pushing ourselves to explore new ideas and other ways to tell our story," said Josh Mayer in an interview.

Track listing

Charts

Weekly charts

Year-end charts

References

External links

2014 albums
The Glitch Mob albums